Obel is a small village in Blagoevgrad Municipality, in Blagoevgrad Province, Bulgaria. It is a mountainous settlement in Vlahina mountain, bordering with North Macedonia. Obel is the last settlement before the border crossing "Stanke Lisichkovo" on the road from Blagoevgrad to Delčevo.

References

Villages in Blagoevgrad Province